HIV/AIDS in Nigeria was a concern in the 2000s, when an estimated seven million people had HIV/AIDS. In 2008, the HIV prevalence rate among adults aged between 15 and 49 was 3.9 percent, in 2018 the rate among adults aged between 15 and 65 was 1.5 percent. As elsewhere in Africa, women are statistically more likely to have HIV/AIDS. The Nigeria HIV/AIDS Indicator and Impact Survey (NAIIS) was the world's largest and presented statistics which showed the overall numbers were lower than expected. Antiretroviral treatment is available, but people prefer to take the therapy secretly, since there is still noticeable discrimination against people with HIV/AIDS.

Background 
Nigeria is emerging from a period of military rule that accounted for almost 28 of the 47 years since independence in 1960. The President's Emergency Plan for AIDS Relief judged that the policy environment is not fully democratized, since civil society was weak during the military era, and its role in advocacy and lobbying remains weak. The size of the population and the nation pose logistical and political challenges particularly due to the political determination of the Nigerian Government to achieve health care equity across geopolitical zones. The necessity to coordinate programs simultaneously at the federal, state and local levels introduces complexity into planning. The large private sector is largely unregulated and, more importantly, has no formal connection to the public health system where most HIV/AIDS interventions are delivered. Training and human resource development is severely limited in all sectors and will hamper program implementation at all levels. Care and support is limited due to the fact that existing staff are overstretched and most have insufficient training in key technical areas to provide complete HIV services.

Treatment 

The Nigerian Government created the National AIDS Control and Prevention Program within the Federal Ministry of Health in 1987, a Presidential AIDS Commission composed of ministers from all sectors in 1999 and the National Action Committee on AIDS based in the Office of the Presidency in 2000. The HIV/AIDS Emergency Action Plan developed in 2001, and revised in 2004, serves as the national action framework.

Seven million people (almost 6 percent of the population] had HIV/AIDS in 2004. In 2008, the HIV prevalence rate among adults aged between 15 and 49 was 3.9 percent. Nigeria has the third-largest number of people living with HIV. The HIV epidemic in Nigeria is complex and varies widely by region. In some states, the epidemic is more concentrated and driven by high-risk behaviors, while other states have more generalized epidemics that are sustained primarily by multiple sexual partnerships in the general population. Youth and young adults in Nigeria are particularly vulnerable to HIV, with young women at higher risk than young men. There are many risk factors that contribute to the spread of HIV, including prostitution, high-risk practices among itinerant workers, high prevalence of sexually transmitted infections, clandestine high-risk heterosexual and homosexual practices, international trafficking of women, and irregular blood screening. It was estimated that 3.4 million people were living with HIV/AIDS, leading the US to spend $400 million annually and the Global Fund to Fight AIDS, Tuberculosis and Malaria $110 million supporting local initiatives.

As of 2018, the HIV/AIDS prevalence rate among adults aged between 15 and 64 was 1.5 percent. This was a lower figure than expected, but the National Agency for the Control of AIDS (NACA) had instituted a new and more accurate statistics program
in 2016. Called the Nigeria HIV/AIDS Indicator and Impact Survey (NAIIS), it was the world's biggest HIV/AIDS survey. It cost $91million and almost 100,000 households were called upon at random, with 250,000 interviewees aged between 15 and 64 years, plus 32,555 children. South South was the zone with the highest prevalence, namely 3.1 percent.

Overall, the prevalence amongst women aged between 15 and 64 was 1.9 percent as compared to 1.1 percent for men. The Joint United Nations Programme on HIV/AIDS had noted in 2004 that from all Africans aged between 15 and 49 who were HIV-positive, 57 percent were female, and from all Africans aged between 15 and 24, 75 percent were female. Activist Yinka Jegede-Ekpe founded the Nigerian Community of Women Living With HIV/AIDS in 2001 and serves on the National Action Committee on AIDS. She commented in 2004 that HIV/AIDS would not be eradicated until men and women were treated equally.

As of 2007, the President's Emergency Plan for AIDS Relief estimated there were 126,400 people receiving antiretroviral treatment. It had provided 4,704,000 condoms for safe sex between 2004 and 2007. A 2006 ethnographic study of how antiretroviral therapy interacted with marriage and sexual reproduction in southeast Nigeria determined that many people taking the drugs were doing so secretly. Whilst there were support groups available, there was still a stigma attached to being HIV-positive and noticeable discrimination against people with HIV/AIDS. When Bisi Alimi announced on a national television show in and later on the BBC World Service that he was gay and HIV-positive, he was arrested and beaten up.

See also 
 AIDS pandemic
 Health care in Nigeria
 HIV/AIDS in Africa

References